This is a list of boroughs (arrondissements) in Quebec. Boroughs are provincially organized recognized sub-municipal administrative divisions that have mayors and councillors.

List

Grenville-sur-la-Rouge 
 Calumet
 Grenville

Longueuil 
 Greenfield Park
 Le Vieux-Longueuil
 Saint-Hubert

Lévis 

 Desjardins
 Les Chutes-de-la-Chaudière-Est
 Les Chutes-de-la-Chaudière-Ouest

Montreal 

 Ahuntsic-Cartierville
 Anjou
 Côte-des-Neiges–Notre-Dame-de-Grâce
 L'Île-Bizard–Sainte-Geneviève
 LaSalle
 Lachine
 Le Plateau-Mont-Royal
 Le Sud-Ouest
 Mercier–Hochelaga-Maisonneuve
 Montréal-Nord
 Outremont
 Pierrefonds-Roxboro
 Rivière-des-Prairies–Pointe-aux-Trembles
 Rosemont–La Petite-Patrie
 Saint-Laurent
 Saint-Léonard
 Verdun
 Ville-Marie
 Villeray–Saint-Michel–Parc-Extension

Métis-sur-Mer 
 MacNider

Quebec City 

 Beauport
 Charlesbourg
 La Cité-Limoilou
 La Haute-Saint-Charles
 Les Rivières
 Sainte-Foy–Sillery–Cap-Rouge

Saguenay 

 Chicoutimi
 Jonquière
 La Baie

Sherbrooke 

 Brompton
 Fleurimont
 Jacques-Cartier
 Lennoxville
 Mont-Bellevue
 Rock Forest–Saint-Élie–Deauville

See also
Local government in Quebec

External links
 List of boroughs at the website of the Ministry of Municipal Affairs, Regions and Land Occupancy

Local government in Quebec
 
Lists of populated places in Quebec